Britt Weerman (born 13 June 2003) is a Dutch high jumper. She won the silver medal at the 2023 European Indoor Championships.

Weerman finished second at the 2022 World Under-20 Championships and was the 2021 European U20 champion. She is the Dutch national record holder in both outdoor and indoor women's high jump, and won six national titles.

Background
Britt Weerman initially trained in gymnastics from the age of six to thirteen when cartilage damage in her elbow joint forced her to stop. She studies Commercial economics at the Johan Cruyff Academy.

Career

In 2020, at age 16/17, Weerman won Dutch under-18 titles in the high jump both indoors and outdoors and also claimed her first national senior titles, both indoors and outdoors.

The following year, she earned the gold medal at the European U20 Championships held in Tallinn, Estonia with a jump of 1.88 m.

In July 2022, the 19-year-old set a Dutch national record of 1.95 m at a meeting in Ninove, Belgium, improving her personal best by 7 centimeters and beating Nadine Broersen' previous record by 1 centimetre. In August, she won silver at the World U20 Championships staged in Cali, Colombia, clearing 1.93 m to finish second behind Karmen Bruus and ahead of Angelina Topić. The same month, she placed fourth with the same result at the European Championships Munich 2022, this time behind Topić who also jumped 1.93 m securing the bronze medal on countback.

On 3 February 2023, Weerman broke by 3 centimeters Broersen's Dutch indoor record with a clearance of 1.96 m in Weinheim, Germany, her outright best. She equalled this achievement at the European Indoor Championships held in March in Istanbul to take the silver medal behind Yaroslava Mahuchikh. It was the first medal for Dutch high jumper in almost fifty years, after :nl:Annemieke Bouma's bronze in 1975.

Achievements
All information from World Athletics profile.

International competitions

Personal bests
 High jump –  (Ninove 2022)  
 High jump indoor –  (Weinheim 2023) 
 High jump indoor U20 –  (Weinheim 2022)

National titles
 Dutch Athletics Championships
 High jump: 2020, 2022
 Dutch Indoor Athletics Championships
 High jump indoor: 2020, 2021, 2022, 2023

References

External links
 

2003 births
Living people
Dutch female high jumpers
21st-century Dutch women
People from Assen